Colonial Hotel, also known as Inn at Wise Courthouse, is a historic hotel building located in Wise, Wise County, Virginia. It was built in 1910, and is a -story, roughly "U"-shaped building with a hipped roof.  It is constructed of brick, painted white, and is in the Colonial Revival style.  It features an angled entrance sheltered by a pedimented colossal Ionic order portico with paired round columns flanked by paneled square columns.

It was listed on the National Register of Historic Places in 1991.

See also 
National Register of Historic Places listings in Wise County, Virginia

References

External links
"Still the Place to be: Group working to restore the Wise Inn," Tricities.com, Allie Robinson, December 12, 2010, Dec 24, 2012

Hotel buildings on the National Register of Historic Places in Virginia
National Register of Historic Places in Wise County, Virginia
Colonial Revival architecture in Virginia
Hotel buildings completed in 1910
Hotels in Virginia
Wise, Virginia
Buildings and structures in Wise County, Virginia
Hotels established in 1910
1910 establishments in Virginia